Abe Bailey Nature Reserve is a protected area in Gauteng, South Africa. It is situated near Carletonville, beside the township of Khutsong on the West Rand.

Fauna 
Over 280 species of birds have been recorded in the reserve, including common sightings of African Fish Eagle and the summer visiting Western Osprey, thousands of Flamingos visit the wetland for a few weeks a year, Yellow-billed Storks have been recorded breeding in the area (one of a few known breeding sites outside of the Okavango delta), rare sightings of both Cape and White-backed Vultures as well as Marabou Storks, Martial Eagle and Giant Eagle-owl.

Leopards are known to enter the area from the Gatsrand range although this is a very rare occurrence, the apex predators in the reserve are Black-backed Jackals (Canis mesomelas), Caracal (Caracal caracal) and Serval (Leptailurus serval), whilst Cape foxes (Vulpes chama) and Aardwolf (Proteles cristatus) are also common in the area, Brown Hyaena (Parahyaena brunnae) vagrant males are known to move through the area but no females have been recorded yet.

Cape Clawless Otter (Aonyx capense), Water Mongoose (Atilax paludinosus), Yellow Mongoose (Cynictis penicillata), Slender Mongoose (Galerella sanguinea), White-tailed Mongoose (Ichneumia albicauda), Striped Weasel (Poecilogale albinucha), Striped Polecat (Ictonyx striatus) and occasionally Honey Badger (Mellivora capensis) are known from the area. Rarely seen Southern African Hedgehogs (Atelerix frontalis) and Aardvark (Orycteropus afar) are also found in the Reserve

Antelope species include species indigenous to the highveld grasslands like Black Wildebeest (Connochates gnou), Blesbok (Damaliscus pygargus phillipsi), Red Hartebeest (Acelaphus buselaphus caama), Plains Zebra (Equus quagga), Springbok (Antidorcus marsupialis), Common Duiker (Sylvicarpa grimmia) and Steenbok (Raphicerus campestris), while occasionally species such as Common Reedbuck (Redunca arundinum), Mountain Reedbuck (Redunca fulvorufula) and Warthog (Phacochorus africanus) make their way to the reserve, via the Gatsrand range where they are known to occur

References

Nature reserves in South Africa
Protected areas of Gauteng